Horace Mann School, also known as Craig Street School, is a historic school building located at Schenectady, Schenectady County, New York. It was built in 1907–1908, and is a two-story, "I"-shaped brick building above a reinforced concrete basement.  The building includes some Neoclassical design elements including large fanlights, a projecting modillioned cornice, and monumental corner pilasters.  A one-story rear addition was constructed in 1986. The Horace Mann School closed in 1981. The building is identical to the former Franklin School, listed on the National Register of Historic Places in 1983.

It was added to the National Register of Historic Places in 2015.

References

School buildings on the National Register of Historic Places in New York (state)
Neoclassical architecture in New York (state)
School buildings completed in 1908
Schools in Schenectady County, New York
National Register of Historic Places in Schenectady County, New York
1908 establishments in New York (state)